The Delightful Rogue is a 1929 pre-Code romantic adventure film produced and distributed by RKO Pictures. The film was directed by A. Leslie Pearce, with the screenplay by Wallace Smith, based on his short story, A Woman Decides.  The film stars Rod La Rocque as a modern-day pirate in the south seas, as well as Rita La Roy and Charles Byer. La Rocque had been playing similar style adventurers in a few of his last silent films, and this film attempts to replicate the success of those silent adventure movies using RCA's early sound equipment, the Photophone system.

Plot
Lastro is a modern-day pirate who hijacks a yacht and heads into the tropic port of Tapit.  He is wanted for a variety of offenses, including murder and robbery.  Upon his arrival, he is recognized by a local native leader, Junipero, but Junipero takes a bribe to not turn him in.  While in Tapit, he sees an American dancer, Nydra, whom he is immediately attracted to.  Nydra is also being pursued by Harry Beall, the heir to a wealthy American family, yet Nydra is intrigued by Lastro's self-assurance and audacity.

Lastro is betrayed by Junipero, who brings the police to arrest him.  In the ensuing melee, Lastro overcomes both Junipero and the police, as well as easily brushing aside Beall.  To secure his safe escape, Lastro takes Beall as a hostage back to his yacht.  Nydra appears to beg Lastro to let Beall go, which Lastro agrees to, on one condition: Nydra must spend the night with him in his cabin aboard the yacht.  Nydra agrees.  Nothing untoward happens, with the two simply spending the time talking and getting to know each other.  Nydra is impressed with Lastro's gallantry.  However, Beall has spent the night imagining the worst, and his jealous reactions in the morning completely turn Nydra off.  Disgusted with his behavior, Nydra sets sails with Lastro.

Cast
Rod La Rocque as Lastro, The Pirate
Rita La Roy as Nydra
Charles Byer as Harry Beal
Ed Brady as MacDougal
Harry Semels as Hymie
Sammy Blum as Junipero
Bert Moorhouse as Nielson

Notes
There was a single song featured in the film, "Gay Love", by the writing team of Oscar Levant and Sidney Clare. Shortly after the film's release, Bing Crosby released a version of "Gay Love" on the B-side of "Can't We Be Friends" on a Columbia Records 78 record.

Wallace Smith's short story, upon which the screenplay was based, originally appeared in Cosmopolitan magazine.

References

External links
The Delightful Rogue at IMDb.com
The Delightful Rogue; allmovie/synopsis

1929 films
American black-and-white films
RKO Pictures films
Transitional sound films
1929 adventure films
1920s romance films
Films based on short fiction
American romance films
American adventure films
Films directed by Lynn Shores
1920s American films